Trypan blue is an azo dye. It is a direct dye for cotton textiles.  In biosciences, it is used as a vital stain to selectively colour dead tissues or cells blue.

Live cells or tissues with intact cell membranes are not coloured. Since cells are very selective in the compounds that pass through the membrane, in a viable cell trypan blue is not absorbed; however, it traverses the membrane in a dead cell. Hence, dead cells appear as a distinctive blue colour under a microscope. Since live cells are excluded from staining, this staining method is also described as a dye exclusion method.

Background and chemistry
Trypan blue is derived from toluidine, that is, any of several isomeric bases, C14H16N2, derived from toluene.
Trypan blue is so-called because it can kill trypanosomes, the parasites that cause sleeping sickness. An analog of trypan blue, suramin, is used pharmacologically against trypanosomiasis. Trypan blue is also known as diamine blue and Niagara blue.

The extinction coefficient for trypan blue is 6⋅104 M−1 cm−1 at 607 nm in methanol.

Trypan red and trypan blue were first synthesized by the German scientist Paul Ehrlich in 1904.

Uses of trypan blue

Trypan blue is commonly used in microscopy (for cell counting) and in laboratory mice for assessment of tissue viability. The method cannot distinguish between necrotic and apoptotic cells.

It may be used to observe fungal hyphae and stramenopiles.

Trypan blue is also used in ophthalmic cataract surgery to stain the anterior capsule in the presence of a mature cataract, to aid in visualization, before creating the continuous curvilinear capsulorhexis. In keratoplasty, trypan blue can be used to stain the posterior stromal fibers during deep lamellar endothelial keratoplasty (DLEK) and to stain the endothelium in Descemet's stripping endothelial keratoplasty (DSEK). Trypan blue is used in vitreoretinal surgeries also.

In early 20th century, the existence of a barrier protective toward the brain (blood brain barrier) was inferred, based on the observation that injection of trypan blue in animals led to whole‐body staining except for the brain and spinal cord.

Synonyms
Azidine blue 3B
Benzamine blue 3B
Benzo Blue bB
Chlorazol blue 3B
Diamine blue 3B
Dianil blue H3G
Direct blue 14
Niagara blue 3B

Further reading
 Chapter "Detection of Caspase Activation Combined with Other Probes of Apoptosis", Eurekah Bioscience Collection, NCBI bookshelf
 Protocol for use of the dye (PDF) from Northwestern University

References

Azo dyes
Cell culture reagents
Vital stains
IARC Group 2B carcinogens
Naphthalenesulfonic acids
1-Naphthols
Naphthylamines

fr:Bleu de trypan#Coloration au bleu de trypan